Christian "Kris" Bouckenooghe (born 7 February 1977) is a retired New Zealand association football player of Belgian and Cook Island Māori descent. He played as a defender, mostly in the lower divisions of Belgian football with one season in the Belgian First Division.

Club career 
He was born in the Cook Islands of a Cook Island Māori mother and a Belgian father, subsequently moving to New Zealand as a child, where he played his youth soccer and attended Tauranga Boys' College. He has played for New Zealand at age-group level, including a play-off series against the South African under-23 team to qualify for the 2000 Sydney Olympics, scoring in the NZ team's narrow 3-4 and 0-1 losses in that series. All of his early career was spent as a midfielder or striker, until converting to defence at K.S.V. Roeselare in Belgium. His first professional club was Rotherham in England, who signed him as a teenager on the recommendation of former New Zealand national coach and ex Rotherham player, Kevin Fallon. From there he signed for KSV Roeselare in the 1990s, his first of two periods with the club. He is the first New Zealander to play in the Belgian First Division.

International career 
Bouckenooghe played 35 A-internationals for the New Zealand national soccer team, the All Whites scoring 2 goals.
His career highlights include playing at both the 1999 and 2003 Confederations Cup in Mexico and France respectively.

Honours 
Belgian Second Division:
Runner-up (1): 2004-05
Belgium Premier Division 2005-06
New Zealand International player of the year 1999

References

External links

1977 births
Living people
Belgian Pro League players
Challenger Pro League players
Cook Island Māori people
Expatriate footballers in England
Association football defenders
Association football midfielders
K.S.V. Roeselare players
K.V. Oostende players
Rotherham United F.C. players
New Zealand expatriate association footballers
New Zealand expatriate sportspeople in England
New Zealand international footballers
New Zealand association footballers
New Zealand people of Belgian descent
1999 FIFA Confederations Cup players
2000 OFC Nations Cup players
2002 OFC Nations Cup players
2003 FIFA Confederations Cup players